ASC De Volewijckers is a Dutch football club that plays in the Vierde Klasse. It is a continuation of ASV–DWV and AVV De Volewijckers.

History

ASV–DWV 

ASV-DWV or Door Wilskracht Verkregen was founded on 12 May 1912 in present-day Amsterdam-Noord. Its home ground was Sportpark Elzenhagen.

ASV-DWV was promoted to first class, the highest amateur football level in the 1913–14 season. As a result of a flood disaster in 1916, the entire accommodation was destroyed.  In 1921 the club started again but now in the third class of the Dutch soccer association (KNVB). In the years 1935, '36 and '37 the club promoted from the third class and second class to the first class again. In the season 1947–48 the club made it to the finals of the 'KNVB' cup, but lost after penalties to F.C. Wageningen

It won the Arol Cup in the season 1959–60.

In the 1954 season 1954 the club chose to remain as an amateur team. It also decided to expand to include additional sports including basketball and volleyball. It decided not to merge with De Volewijckers.

In 1975–76 DWV was promoted from second class to the main class. Two seasons later, the season 1977–78, therefore they were able to participate in the KNVB Amateur Cup.

KNVB Amateur Cup  
 Winner in 1978, 1990

District Cup West I 
Winner in 1978, 1990

AVV De Volewijckers 

De Volewijckers was one of a number of Dutch football clubs that were successful in post-war leagues before being forced to merge to cope with the popularity of bigger teams such as Ajax and Feyenoord. In 1942, they were promoted to the top tier of Dutch football to become the biggest club in Amsterdam. They played their home games at Mosveld in Amsterdam-Noord but moved to Ajax' Stadion de Meer during the Second World War after Mosveld was bombed. In 1944, they were crowned Dutch league champions. Formerly amateur, they became a professional club in 1954 and played in the Eredivisie from 1961 through 1963. They were forced to leave Mosveld in 1964 and were moved to a new complex in Buiksloterbanne.

In 1974, the club merged with Blauw Wit and DWS to form FC Amsterdam. De Volewijckers continued as an amateur club.

DVC Buiksloot 
AVV De Volewijckers merged with DWV to form DVC Buiksloot in summer 2013. The merged club adopted the name ASC De Volewijckers in 2019.

References

External links
 
 Homepage KNVB
 Contact DWV
Official website of De Volewijckers 

 
Football clubs in Amsterdam
Association football clubs established in 1920
Association football clubs disestablished in 2013
Association football clubs established in 1912
1920 establishments in the Netherlands
2013 disestablishments in the Netherlands
Football clubs in the Netherlands
1912 establishments in the Netherlands